Kim Min-hak (born 4 October 1988) is a South Korean footballer who plays as a full back for Gyeongnam FC in the K-League.

External links 
 

K3 League players
1988 births
Living people
Association football fullbacks
South Korean footballers
Jeonbuk Hyundai Motors players
Gyeongnam FC players
K League 1 players